Calcium is a rural locality in the City of Townsville, Queensland, Australia.

Geography 
Manton is a neighbourhood within the locality.

There are a number of mountains in the locality:

History 
The locality was named and bounded on 27 July 1991. It was presumably named after the now-abandoned Calcium railway station on the Great Northern railway, which had been named prior to 1914 after the calcium-bearing lime that was mined in the area.

Manton takes its name from the now-abandoned Manton railway station, which takes its name from a pioneer farmer.

References 

City of Townsville
Localities in Queensland